Erewash is a local government district with borough status in  Derbyshire, England, to the east of Derby and the west of Nottingham. The population of the district as taken at the 2011 Census was 112,081. 
It contains the towns of Ilkeston, Long Eaton and Sandiacre and fourteen civil parishes.

The borough was formed on 1 April 1974 by the merger of the Borough of Ilkeston, the Long Eaton urban district and part of South East Derbyshire Rural District.

The borough council's operations are split between Ilkeston Town Hall and Long Eaton Town Hall.

Erewash Borough has military affiliations with 814 Naval Air Squadron Fleet Air Arm based at Royal Naval Air Station (RNAS) Culdrose and the Mercian Regiment of the British Army, as the successors to the local regiment the Sherwood Foresters

Council

Erewash Borough Council has been controlled by the Conservatives since 2003, with Carol Hart being leader of the council since 2017. At the 2019 election the Conservatives won 27 seats, Labour 19 seats and the Liberal Democrats 1 seat. The next election is due in 2023.

Education
The borough is home to the public school, Trent College, The Long Eaton School in 
Long Eaton, Erewash and its junior/preparatory school, The Elms School, along with 14 state-funded secondary schools and 41 primary schools.

Broomfield Hall of Derby College is located in Morley.

Derby Japanese School (ダービー日本人補習校 Dābī Nihonjin Hoshūkō), a Japanese weekend school, holds its classes in Broomfield Hall.

Arms

References

 
Non-metropolitan districts of Derbyshire
Boroughs in England